DNADynamo is a commercial DNA sequence analysis software package produced by Blue Tractor Software Ltd  that runs on Microsoft Windows, Mac OS X and Linux
It is used by molecular biologists to analyze DNA and Protein sequences.  A free demo is available from the software developers website.

Features 
DNADynamo is a general purpose DNA and Protein sequence analysis package that can carry out most of the functions required by a standard research molecular biology laboratory

 DNA and Protein Sequence viewing, editing and annotating
 Contig assembly and chromatogram editing including comparison to a reference sequence to identify mutations
 Global Sequence alignment with ClustalW and MUSCLE and editing.
 Select and drag Sequence alignment editing for hand made dna vs protein alignments
 Restriction site analysis - for viewing restriction cut sites in tables and on linear and circular maps.
 A Subcloning tool for the assembly of constructs using Restriction Sites or Gibson assembly, 
 Agarose Gel simulation.
 Online Database searching - Search public databases at the NCBI such as Genbank and  UniProt.
 Online BLAST searches.
 Protein analysis including estimation of Molecular Weight, Extinction Coefficient and pI.
 PCR Primer design, including an interface to Primer3
 3D structure viewing via an interface to Jmol

History 

DNADynamo has been developed since 2004 by BlueTractorSoftware Ltd, a software development company based in North Wales, UK

References

External links 
DNADynamo homepage

Bioinformatics software
Computational science